The 1987 King Cup was the 29th season of the knockout competition since its establishment in 1956. Al-Nassr were the defending champions and successfully defended their title by beating Al-Hilal 1–0 in the final. They became the first team since Al-Ahli in 1979 to successfully defend the title.

Bracket

Note:     H: Home team,   A: Away team  

Source: Al Jazirah

Round of 16
The Round of 16 matches were held on 23, 26 and 27 February 1987.

Quarter-finals
The Quarter-final matches were held on 2 March 1987.

Semi-finals
The four winners of the quarter-finals progressed to the semi-finals. The semi-finals were played on 6 March 1987. All times are local, AST (UTC+3).

Final
The final was played between city rivals Al-Hilal and Al-Nassr at the Youth Welfare Stadium in Al-Malaz, Riyadh. Al-Hilal were appearing in their 11th while Al-Nassr were appearing in their 8th final. Al-Nassr were the defending champions.

Top goalscorers

References

1987
Saudi Arabia
Cup